Weaverville United Methodist Church is a historic United Methodist church located at Weaverville, Buncombe County, North Carolina. It was built in 1919–1920, and is a two-story, five bay, brick church with Classical Revival and Late Gothic Revival design influences.  The front facade features a two-story, three bay portico.  Attached to the church is the educational building constructed in 1956–1957.

It was listed on the National Register of Historic Places in 1996.

References

External links

20th-century Methodist church buildings in the United States
United Methodist churches in North Carolina
Churches on the National Register of Historic Places in North Carolina
Neoclassical architecture in North Carolina
Gothic Revival church buildings in North Carolina
Churches completed in 1920
Churches in Buncombe County, North Carolina
National Register of Historic Places in Buncombe County, North Carolina
Neoclassical church buildings in the United States